Political Manifest is the seventh album by the Original Harmony Ridge Creekdippers, released in 2004. The album reflects singer/songwriter Mark Olson's disgust at the state of the US. It was released on Mercy Recordings in the US.

Reception

Uncut magazine gave the album a score of 3 and wrote "[Olson's] disgust at the state of the nation as befits all things Creekdipper is elegantly realised, simmering over a bedrock of soft piano, woody guitars and some slow, funky blues"

Track listing
All songs Mark Olson except where noted.
 "Poor GW"
 "Walk with Them"
 "Duck Hunting"
 "Senator Byrd Speech"
 "Where is My Baby Boy"
 "George Bush Industriale"
 "Saw Song"
 "Portrait of a Sick America"
 "My Father Knows Foes" (Traditional)
 "The End of the Highway"
 "Coming, Coming" (Traditional)

Personnel
Mark Olson – vocals, piano, dulcimer, bass, flute 
Victoria Williams – vocals, electric guitar, tres 
Ray Woods – vocals, drums 
Don Heffington – vocals, bass harmonica, saw 
Tom Freund – bass, organ 
Greg Leisz – dobro

Production notes
Mark Olson – producer, engineer
David Vaught – mixing
Bob Stone – mastering

References

2004 albums
Original Harmony Ridge Creekdippers albums